is a former professional Japanese baseball player. He played as an outfielder for the Hiroshima Toyo Carp.

External links

 NPB.com

1979 births
Living people
Baseball people from Ōita Prefecture
People from Usuki, Ōita
Hosei University alumni
Nippon Professional Baseball outfielders
Hiroshima Toyo Carp players
Olympic baseball players of Japan
Baseball players at the 2000 Summer Olympics
Japanese baseball coaches
Nippon Professional Baseball coaches